UEFA European Championship songs and anthems are songs and tunes adopted officially to be used as warm-ups to the event, to accompany the championships during the event and as a souvenir reminder of the events as well as for advertising campaigns leading for the European Championship, giving the singers exceptional universal world coverage and notoriety.

The songs chosen are usually multilingual using English, the language of the official language of the organising country as well as other world languages, most notably Spanish. The official versions also results in cover versions in many other languages by the original artist or by local artists.

Official songs and anthems

Entrance music

Official albums
 1996 – The Beautiful Game
 2000 – Euro 2000: The Official Album
 2004 – Vive O 2004!

See also
 List of FIFA World Cup songs and anthems
 List of Copa América songs and anthems
 List of Africa Cup of Nations songs and anthems
 List of AFC Asian Cup songs and anthems

References

Official songs
 
UEFA European Championship symbols
UEFA